Kissimmee is a small town located in Snyder County, Pennsylvania.

References

Unincorporated communities in Snyder County, Pennsylvania
Unincorporated communities in Pennsylvania